Tremain is a Cornish language surname and, rarely, forename. 

Notable people with the surname include:
 Chris Tremain (born 1966), New Zealand politician
 Garrick Tremain (born 1941), New Zealand cartoonist and painter
 George Tremain (1874–1948), Justice of the Indiana Supreme Court
 Kel Tremain (1938–1992), New Zealand international rugby player
 Lyman Tremain (1819–1878), American politician
 Rose Tremain (born 1943), British historical novelist

Notable people with the forename include:
 Tremain Mack (born 1974), American football player

See also

 Johnny Tremain, 1943 children's novel by Esther Forbes
 Johnny Tremain (film), based on the novel
 Tremaine (disambiguation)
 Tremayne (disambiguation)

Cornish-language surnames